Sun June is an American indie pop band from Austin, Texas.

History
Sun June released their first full-length album in 2018 titled Years via Keeled Scales. In October 2020, the group announced their second full-length album. The group released that album, Somewhere, in 2021 through Keeled Scales and Run for Cover.

Band members
Laura Colwell – vocals
Michael Bain – guitar
Justin Harris – bass
Sarah Schultz – drums
Stephen Salisbury - Guitar

Discography

Studio albums
Years (2018, Keeled Scales)
Somewhere (2021, Keeled Scales, Run for Cover)

References

Musical groups from Austin, Texas